The lexis of the Romanian language (or Daco-Romanian), a Romance language, has changed over the centuries as the language evolved from Vulgar Latin, to Common Romanian, to medieval, modern and contemporary Romanian. A large proportion (about 42%) of present-day Romanian lexis is not inherited from Latin and in some semantic areas loanwords far outnumber inherited ones making Romanian an example of a language with a high degree of lexical permeability.

Thraco-Dacian substrate

From Thraco-Dacian around 90 words are found in Romanian.

abur, argea, baci, balaur, bală, balegă, baltă, barză, bască, bâlc, bâr, brad, brânză, brâu, brusture, buc, bucur, bunget, buză, căciulă, călbează, căpuşă, cătun, ceafă, cioară, cioc, ciucă, ciuf, ciump, ciupi, ciut, coacăză, copac, copil, curpen, cursă, droaie, druete, fărâmă, fluier, gard, gata, ghimpe, ghionoaie, ghiuj, grapă, gresie, groapă, grumaz, grunz, guşă, hameş, jumătate, lete, leurdă, mal, mare (adj.), mazăre, măgar, măgură, mărar, mânz, moş, mugur, murg, muşcoi, năpârcă, noian, pârâu, pupăză, raţă, rânză, sarbăd, scăpăra, scrum, sâmbure, spânz, strepede, strugure, strungă, şopârlă, ştiră, ţap, ţarc, ţeapă, urdă, vatră, viezure, vizuină, zară, zgardă.

Latin

Romanian has inherited about 2000 Latin words through Vulgar Latin, sometimes referred as Danubian Latin in this context, that form the essential part of the lexis and without them communication would not be possible. 500 of this words are found in all other Romance languages and they include prepositions and conjunctions (ex: cu, de, pe, spre), numerals (ex: unu, doi, trei), pronouns (ex: eu, tu, noi, voi), adjectives, adverbs and verbs with multiple meanings (ex: bun, dulce, foarte, avea, veni). Complete phrases can be built using only inherited Latin words. 
 
Of the remaining words some are common to Romanian and only one other Romance language, such as înțelege "to understand" also found in Romansh (Lat.intelligere), trece "to pass" found in Occitan (Lat. traicere), or sui "to climb up" found in Old Spanish (Lat. subire), and around 100 of these words are not found in any other Romance languages. Some examples of the later are:

adăpost, ager, agest, apuca, armar, asuda, aşterne, cântec, ceață, cerceta, creştin, dezmierda, feri, ferice, flămând, ierta, întâi, judeţ, lânced, lângoare, legăna, leşina, lingură, mărgea, negustor, oaie, ospăț, plăcintă, plăsa, plimba, purcede, puroi, putred, sănătoare (sunătoare), suoară (subsoară), treaptă, trepăda, urca, vânăt, vătăma, veşted, urî.

Of the words preserved in other Romance languages some have not only changed their shape, but also their meaning during their evolution from Latin to Romanian. Such are:

 bărbat "man" (< Latin barbātus "bearded")
 ceață "fog" (<Latin caecia - "blindness")
 femeie "woman" (< Latin familia "people belonging to a household")
 inimă "heart" (< Latin anima "soul")
 soț and soață "husband" and "wife" (< Latin socius "fellow")

Slavic languages
(see also Slavic influence on Romanian)

Contact with Slavic languages has brought numerous loanwords (about 15% of the current lexis) that permeated all the semantic fields of the language. It also brought prefixes (ne-, pre-, răs-) and suffixes (-an,-eț, -iște), introduced new sounds (for example j like in jar from Old Church Slavonic žarŭ), calques (limbă with initial meaning of tongue, language gained the additional sense of people, after Old Church Slavonic językŭ- tongue, language, people) adverbs and interjections (da, ba, iată). The influence of the Slavic languages on Romanian forms the adstratum of the language.

Among the basic Slavic loanwords are:
 ceas clock
 citi to read
 crai king
 curvă whore
 da yes
 drag dear
 dragoste love
 duh spirit, ghost
 haină shirt
 iubi to love
 izvor source
 mândru proud
 muncă work
 noroc luck
 opri stop
 porni start
 praf dust
 prieten friend
 prost stupid; simple
 rând row; order
 sărac poor
 sfânt holy
 sfert quarter
 slănină bacon
 smântână sour cream
 sută hundred
 târg market
 tigaie pan
 trup body
 veac century
 vreme weather; time
 zid wall

Modern Romanian

Romanian dialect, called Daco-Romanian in specialty literature to distinguish it from the other dialects of Common Romanian, inherited from Latin about 2000 words (a similar number to other Romance languages), a relatively small number compared to its modern lexis of 150000. In the 19th century, as the Romanian society transitioned from rural and agricultural towards urban and industrial, the lexis underwent a vigorous enrichment with loanwords from its Romance relatives, French and Italian. Many scholarly and technical terms were also imported from Neo-Latin. Some words, especially of Greek and Turkish origin, fell into relative disuse or acquired an ironic connotation.

Among the words which entered the language:
 deja "already" (from French déjà)
 jena "disturb" (from French gener)
 medic "physician" (from Latin medicus)
 servi "serve" (from French or Italian)
 ziar "newspapers" (from Italian diario)

A statistical analysis sorting Romanian words by etymological source carried out by Macrea (1961) based on the DLRM (49,649 words) showed the following makeup:

 43% recent Romance loans (mainly French: 38.42%, Latin: 2.39%, Italian: 1.72%)
 20% inherited Latin
 11.5% Slavic (Old Church Slavonic: 7.98%, Bulgarian: 1.78%, Bulgarian-Serbian: 1.51%)
 8.31% Unknown/unclear origin
 3.62% Turkish
 2.40% Modern Greek
 2.17% Hungarian
 1.77% German (including Austrian High German)
 2.24% Onomatopoeic

If the analysis is restricted to a core vocabulary of 2,500 frequent, semantically rich and productive words, then the Latin inheritance comes first, followed by Romance and classical Latin neologisms, whereas the Slavic borrowings come third.

Romanian has a lexical similarity of 77% with Italian, 75% with French, 74% with Sardinian, 73% with Catalan, 72% with Portuguese and Rheto-Romance, 71% with Spanish.

Turkish influence 

Large parts of modern-day Romania were under Ottoman suzerainty for several centuries. As a result, exchanges in language, food and culture occurred, and Romanian has absorbed several words of Turkish origin. A small ethnic Turkish minority exists in Dobruja.

 abanos "ebony" (< Turkish abanoz)
 arpagic "chive" (< Turkish arpacık)
 baclava "baclava" (< Turkish baklava)
 bacșiș "tip, gratuity" (< Turkish bahşiş)
 basma "kerchief" (< Turkish basma)
 batal "wether" (< Turkish batal)
 belea "misfortune" (< Turkish bela)
 boi "to paint" (< Turkish boy)
 bre "hey" (< Turkish bre)
 briceag "pocket knife" (< Turkish bıçak)
 buluc "pile" (< Turkish bölük)
 burghiu "drill" (< Turkish bürgü)
 bursuc "badger" (< Turkish porsuk)
 caimac "cream" (< Turkish kaymak)
 caisă "apricot" (< Turkish kayısı)
 calcană "turbot" (< Turkish kalkan balığı)
 caldarâm "pavement" (< Turkish kaldırım)
 capcană "trap" (< Turkish kapkan)
 caraghios "funny" (< Turkish Karagöz)
 cat "storey" (< Turkish kat)

Many Ottoman and Phanariot Greek words have acquired pejorative meanings compared with their original meaning:
 Turkish  ("stick") became  ("the tube of a hookah") and now is "bribe", since, like a pipe, it is offered to ease a deal.
 Ottoman  ("treasure, treasure chamber") became  ("septic tank, latrine").
 Phanariot Greek  ("practical-minded man") became  ("immoral person"). Its cognate  from French  has maintained a neutral meaning.
 Arabic , rāḥa(t) al-ḥulqūm ("throat comfort"), through Turkish  ("Turkish delights") became Romanian  ("shit").

See also
Substrate in Romanian
List of Romanian words of possible Dacian origin
Romanian Academy

References

Lexis, Romanian
Lexis (linguistics)